Rengasamudram is a village near Bhramadesom in Ambasamudram taluka in Tirunelveli district in the state of Tamil Nadu, India. The population was 2,381 at the 2011 Indian census.

References 

Villages in Tirunelveli district